The Gazzetta Ufficiale della Repubblica Italiana (Italian) is the official journal of record of the Italian government. It is published by the Istituto Poligrafico e Zecca dello Stato in Rome.

Function
The Gazzetta Ufficiale promulgates acts of the Italian Parliament (comprising the Senate of the Republic and Chamber of Deputies) and Decrees of the President of the Republic. On publication, legislation begins a brief period (usually 15 days) known as vacatio legis, allowing for it to become widely known before taking legal effect.

Part I comprises the General Series, published every weekday, together with the following special editions:

Part II, containing all other notices, is published on Tuesdays, Thursdays and Saturdays. The 5th Special Series has been published since 3 January 2007, bringing together listings published, until 31 December 2006, in Part II under Announcements and Auction Notices.

The Gazzetta Ufficiale was formerly available for free online consultation for a period of 60 days. A subscription was required to access back issues. From 1 January 2013, the Ministry of Economy and Finance, in agreement with the Ministry of Justice, and with the contribution of the Poligrafico Institute and Mint of the State, makes available in its various series, free of charge, the Official Journal in digital format .

History 
The Gazzetta Ufficiale derives from the Gazzetta Piemontese, the official newspaper of the Kingdom of Sardinia, which published from 2 August 1814 to 31 December 1859. An earlier Gazzetta Piemontese had been published from 1797 to 1800, but was suspended during the Napoleonic period. Publication resumed with the Restoration and in 1848 the subtitle Giornale Ufficiale del Regno ('Official Journal of the Kingdom') was added.

The newspaper became the Gazzetta Ufficiale del Regno on 4 January 1860, then Gazzetta Ufficiale del Regno d'Italia ('Official Gazette of the Kingdom of Italy') on 17 March 1861, and finally, Gazzetta Ufficiale della Repubblica Italiana after the institutional referendum  on the form of state held on 2  June 1946.

The Gazzetta Piemontese title was revived as an unconnected newspaper in 1867; in 1895 it became the national daily La Stampa, published in Turin.

Project AU.G.U.STO. (Automazione Gazzetta Ufficiale Storica) has begun to make the entire collection of Gazzetta Ufficiale del Regno d'Italia available free of charge online.

See also
Official Journal of the European Union

References

External links
Gazzetta Ufficiale della Repubblica Italiana 
Gazzetta Ufficiale del Regno d'Italia 

Government of Italy
Newspapers published in Italy
Newspapers published in Rome
I
Italian-language newspapers